Carlos Martínez de Irujo y Tacón, 1st Marquess of Casa Irujo (4 December 1763, in Cartagena – 17 January 1824, in Madrid), was a Spanish prime minister and diplomat, Knight of the Order of Charles III and public official.

Biography
His father was Manuel Martinez de Irujo y de Erice and his mother Narcisa Tacón y Gamiz (born Beriain, Navarre, 1740). He had two siblings, Narcisa Martínez de Irujo y Tacón and María Rafaela Martínez de Irujo y Tacón.

Casa Irujo (often spelled Yrujo) was the Spanish minister to the United States from 1796 to 1807. Casa Irujo changed positions and became minister at Rio de Janeiro and then Paris.

He was Secretary of state (Prime Minister) of Spain (ministro de estado) three times, first in 1812, then in an interim capacity from 1818 to 1819, and finally for a few weeks from December 1823 until his death in January 1824.

In 1794 while an attaché at the Spanish embassy in London he had an illegitimate daughter named Lavinia de Irujo. Lavinia herself later gave birth to two daughters Fredericka and Frances out of wedlock, the father being Major Charles Jones (father of Ernest Charles Jones, a poet, dramatist and novelist.) There are several drawings of Lavinia by the artist Henry Fuseli (1741-1825).

In 1798 Don Carlos married Sarah McKean, the daughter of Pennsylvania governor Thomas McKean. The couple have been described as " intriguers of the highest order." Their son Carlos Martínez de Irujo y McKean (1802-1855), Duque of Sotomayor, became prime minister of Spain for a short period in 1847.

Character

"He was an obstinate, impetuous and rather vain little person with reddish hair; enormously wealthy, endlessly touchy, extremely intelligent and vastly attractive … he liked America, he understood it and enjoyed it; he was tremendously popular at Philadelphia, and at Washington when he condescended to appear there; he was on intimate terms at the President's House. If he lost his temper from time to time, and thought nothing of haranguing the country through the newspapers, he served his King with energetic loyalty; he went about his business with dignity and shrewdness; he never forgot the respect due to his official person, however much he might indulge his democratic tendencies in private intercourse; he was the only Minister of the first rank in America, and consequently the
leading figure in the diplomatic corps; he contributed to American society the brilliant qualities of his elegant and felicitous personality; he was a very great gentleman."

— from Aaron Burr, Samuel H. Wandell, Meade Minnigerode, 1925.

Yrujo was doubly and trebly attached to the Administration. Proud as a typical Spaniard should be, and mingling and infusion of vanity with his pride; irascible, headstrong, indiscreet as was possible for a diplomatist, and afraid of no prince or president; young, able, quick, and aggressive; devoted to his King and country; a flighty and dangerous friend, but a most troublesome enemy; always in difficulties, but in spite of fantastic outbursts always respectable,—Yrujo needed only the contrast of characters such as those of Pickering or Madison to make him the most entertaining figure in Washington politics. He loved the rough-and-tumble of democratic habits, and remembered his diplomatic dignity only when he could use it as a weapon against a secretary of state. If he thought the Government to need assistance or warning, he wrote communications to the newspapers in a style which long experience had made familiar to the public and irritating to the Government whose acts he criticized.

- from The First Administration of Thomas Jefferson, Part I, Chapter 17

References

External links
 Caballeros de Carlos III

1763 births
1824 deaths
Politicians from Cartagena, Spain
Spanish diplomats
Spanish translators
University of Salamanca alumni
Prime Ministers of Spain
Ambassadors of Spain to the United States
Ambassadors of Spain to France
English–Spanish translators